Puccinia arachidis, or peanut rust, is a plant pathogen that causes rust on peanut. Its spread is promoted by warm, damp weather.

See also
 List of Puccinia species

References

External links
 USDA ARS Fungal Database
  photos

arachidis
Fungi described in 1884
Fungal plant pathogens and diseases
Peanut diseases